Pleaux (Auvergnat: Pleus) is a commune in the Cantal department in south-central France.

Geography
The Maronne river forms the commune's southern border, with the Enchanet reservoir.

Population

Sights
 Château de Branzac, 15th century ruined castle
 The Enchanet dam on the Maronne is on the border with the commune of Arnac

See also
Communes of the Cantal department

References

Communes of Cantal
Auvergne
Cantal communes articles needing translation from French Wikipedia